The Chicago Fall Tennis Classic is a tennis tournament held in Chicago, Illinois for female professional tennis players, whose first edition is part of the 2021 WTA Tour. It will be held on outdoor hard courts and will be held late September.

Results

Singles

Doubles

References 

Tennis tournaments in Illinois
Women's tennis tournaments in the United States